Trombidium hungaricum is a species of mites in the genus Trombidium in the family Trombidiidae. It is found in Hungary.

References
 Synopsis of the described Arachnida of the World: Trombidiidae

Further reading
  (1957): Beiträge zur Trombidiidenfauna Ungarns. Acta Vet. Hungarica 7: 175-184.

Trombidiidae
Animals described in 1957
Arachnids of Europe